Nick Lloyd may refer to:
 Nick Lloyd (rugby union)
 Nick Lloyd (historian)